In mathematics, a coordinate-induced basis is a basis for the tangent space or cotangent space of a manifold that is induced by a certain coordinate system. Given the coordinate system , the coordinate-induced basis  of the tangent space is given by 
 
and the dual basis  of the cotangent space is

References
D.J. Hurley, M.A. Vandyck Topics in Differential Geometry: a New Approach Using D-Differentiation (2002 Springer) p. 5

Differential geometry